Participants in organized crime in Chicago at various times have included members of the Chicago Outfit associated with Al Capone, the Valley Gang, the North Side Gang, Prohibition gangsters, and others.

Chicago Outfit (Al Capone Gang) 
(Formerly called the "Capone Gang".)
Jim Colosimo, founder
Johnny Torrio, foundational leader of American organized crime
Al Capone, heir of American organized crime
Frank Nitti
Paul Ricca
Tony Accardo

Valley Gang 
Paddy Ryan
Terry Druggan
Frankie Lake

Genna Crime Family 
Angelo Genna
Mike Genna
Pete Genna
Jim Genna
Sam Genna
Tony Genna

North Side Gang 
Dion O'Banion
Hymie Weiss
Vincent Drucci
George Moran

Chicago gang leaders 
Joey Aiello (Unione Siciliana takeover)
Sam Cardinelli ("Black Hand" gang)

Prohibition gangs 
Roger Touhy (Des Plaines, Illinois)
Ragen's Colts, founded as a baseball team by James M. Ragen on the South Side
Southside O'Donnell's
Westside O'Donnells, led by Myles O'Donnell and William O'Donnell
Frank McErlane-Joe Saltis Gang

Racketeers 
Maurice Enright, Chicago labor racketeer

References

Organized crime in Chicago